Rapture is the second album by Bradley Joseph, and his debut album on the Narada label, released in March 1997. This is an instrumental album in which Joseph wrote and conducted all of the scores. In addition to incorporating a core band including violinist Charlie Bisharat and drummer Charlie Adams, he used a 50-piece orchestra. It is an "expression of a life's work and dreams", featuring intimate piano pieces, quartets and full orchestrations, "combining smooth jazz with contemporary instrumental themes". It reached New Age Voice (NAV)'s "Airwaves Top 30" at No. 15 in July 1997.

History
During his years of worldwide concert tours as keyboardist with Yanni and Sheena Easton, Bradley Joseph released his debut album, Hear the Masses in 1994. Subsequently, Joseph attracted the attention of Narada Productions via the World Wide Web. A representative for Narada came across Joseph's website and downloaded some music. This sparked their interest and resulted in signing Joseph to a multi-record deal.

The outcome was Rapture, Joseph's second album, which was recorded at a number of different studios including Captain and Tennille's studio in Los Angeles and Pachyderm Studio in Cannon Falls, Minnesota.

In addition to using a core band including Charlie Adams on percussion, Charlie Bisharat on violin and Steven Trochlil on clarinet, Joseph brought in a 50-piece orchestra and conducted and wrote all the scores.  Michael Debbage of Wind and Wire magazine recalls, "It was the year 1997 and New Age music had already peaked commercially as the interest and exposure seemed to lag. The genres main labels – Narada, Windham Music, and Higher Octave – were beginning to explore worldly themes versus the warm, earthly, acoustic themes that prior artists had established. It appeared that the abundance of new artists was becoming a dying breed. An exception to the rule was Bradley Joseph, who released his first mainstream album Rapture to glorious reviews, and to this day it remains his tour de force."

Joseph used the Yamaha and Bösendorfer pianos for this album. He often references the past when he names his songs and his music is frequently reminiscent of his rural Minnesota roots. His company, Robbins Island Music, [and song] is named after a city park in Willmar, says Anne Polta of the West Central Tribune.

Critical reception

Ken Moore of the Naples Daily News cites, "Joseph's music is backed by 15 talented musicians, some playing three or more different instruments that make up a symphony of sounds ranging from quietly pensive mood music to a rich orchestration of classical depth and breadth."  It contains "...heavy flowing strings and emotion-filled keyboard melodies, as on 'A Lover's Return'", states the Johnson County Sun, while Ross Boissoneau of Allmusic contradicts saying, "...Joseph has a good ear for melody, but he pretty much refrains from Yanni's trademark sweeping, whooshing synth swells."

A review of Rapture from New Age Voice states, "Joseph is smooth, painting romantic pictures in sound with voices and instruments that escalate from quiet, intimate passages to big, energetic movements.  The arrangements are structured so that the trumpet can lead a line out on 'Be Still' signaling an introspective sort of mood.  Yet the strings swell on 'The Passage', engulfing the listener in an ocean of sound.  Even cuts that start quiet, such as 'Healing the Hollow Man' or 'Blue Rock Road' ebb and flow between quiet moments and crescendos."

John Blake of The Atlanta Journal notes that often New Age music sounds as if it should be played in a supermarket. The songs can sound like musical cotton candy — soft, airy and ultimately uninteresting. "For the most part, Bradley's music doesn't make that mistake." "The music is cinematic, filled with introspective piano solos, swelling violins, and a hypnotic song pacing that allows the listener to daydream."

Track listing

"A Lover's Return" – 4:08
"Feel" – 4:32
"Jewel" – 4:26
"Healing the Hollow Man"  – 4:12
"Blue Rock Road" – 3:13
"Robbins Island" – 3:54
"Stray" – 6:05
"A Stolen Kiss" – 4:08
"The Gallery" – 4:30
"Be Still" – 2:52
"Coastal Highway" – 3:14
"Storyteller" – 4:56
"The Passage" – 4:18

Personnel
All songs composed, arranged, and produced by Bradley Joseph.
Bradley Joseph – keyboards, vocals
Charlie Adams, Marc Anderson – percussion
James Anton – electric bass
Gordy Johnson – string bass
Daniel Neale, Aron "Pumpkin" Trooien – guitar
James Wheeler – drums
David Levin, Clystie Whang – vocals
Charlie Bisharat – solo violin
Terry Brau – bass clarinet, trumpet
Melissa Hasin – solo cello
Brian Pearson – flute, trumpet
Jennifer Schumacher – English horn, oboe
Steven P. Trochlil – clarinet

"Special thanks to the St. Olaf Players."

Production
Recorded at Pachyderm Studio, Cannon Falls, Minnesota.  Engineered by Bob DeMaa and Bradley Joseph.
Additional recording at:
The "A" room at Creation Audio Recording, Minneapolis.  Engineered by Lynn Peterson and Bradley Joseph.
Rumbo Recorders, Los Angeles.  Engineered by Mark Agostino.
More Core Music, Minneapolis; and Big World Studios, Willmar, MN.  Engineered by Bradley Joseph.
Mixed by Dan Harjung and Bradley Joseph at Secret Sound, Franklin, TN; assisted by engineer Chuck Linder.
Executive Producer - Dan Harjung
Mastered by - Treavor Sadler, Narada Media, using Apogee's UV22 digital process.

References

External links
 Bradley Joseph's official website

1997 albums
Bradley Joseph albums
Narada Productions albums